Vidyaloka College is a boys' school in Galle, Sri Lanka. The school was established on 14 January 1941 by philanthropist Henry Woodward Amarasuriya under the patronage of Venerable Weliwitiye Punyasara Thera. It is a national school which accommodates over 3,100+ students and provides primary and secondary education to them. The school was re-constructed after it was badly affected by the Indian Ocean tsunami in 2004.

College Today 
The college today provides education to about 3,100+ students from grade 1 to grade 13 and it is regarded as one of the leading boys' schools in the Southern Province of Sri Lanka.

School Boundaries 
The land named ‘Kekiri Obada Watta’ where the school is located stretches up to the Wackwella road to the East, Vidyaloka Lane to the North, Sri Devamitta Mawatha to the West and Queens Cinema to the South and it is a flat land of about of 2 acres of extent situated in the heart of Galle city.

Past principals 
 1941 - 1944           : E. A. C. Munasinghe
 1945 - 1964           : B. D. P. de Silva
 1964 - 1965           : A. Hendravitharana
 1965 - 1971           : B. K. de Silva
 1971 - 1977           : Chandradasa de Silva
 1977 - 1981           : Christy Nanayakkara 
 1981 - 1995           : D. H. Senevirathna
 1996 - 2004           : M. B. L. de Silva
 2004 - 2010           : N. G. Gunapala 
 2010 - 2013  : F. Welege
2013–present         : Prasanna Senewiraththne

College Houses 
Students are divided into four houses according to their admission number. These houses are named after four ancient kings of Sri Lanka.

-Ashoka
-Gemunu
-Prakrama
-Sangabo

Notable alumni

References

External links
Vidyaloka College Website
Old Boys Association of Vidyaloka College

1941 establishments in Ceylon
Boys' schools in Sri Lanka
Educational institutions established in 1941
National schools in Sri Lanka
Schools in Galle